Beyens is a surname. Notable people with the surname include:

 Beyens de Grambais, Dutch-Belgian nobility
 Beyens (Belgian family), Belgian nobility
 Beyens (Spanish family), Spanish merchant family in Cadiz
 Kristof Beyens (born 1983), Belgian sprinter

See also
 Boyens